The fourth season of Superstore, the U.S. television series, was ordered on February 21, 2018. The season premiered on October 4, 2018 and contained 22 episodes. The series continued to air in the same timeslot Thursday at 8:00 pm. The season concluded on May 16, 2019.

Superstore follows a group of employees working at Cloud 9, a fictional big-box store in St. Louis, Missouri. The ensemble and supporting cast features America Ferrera, Ben Feldman, Lauren Ash, Colton Dunn, Nico Santos, Nichole Bloom, and Mark McKinney.

Cast

Main
America Ferrera as Amy Sosa 
Ben Feldman as Jonah Simms
Lauren Ash as Dina Fox
Colton Dunn as Garrett McNeil
Nico Santos as Mateo Fernando Aquino Liwanag
Nichole Bloom as Cheyenne Thompson
Mark McKinney as Glenn Philip Sturgis

Recurring
 Michael Bunin as Jeff Sutton
 Kaliko Kauahi as Sandra Kaluiokalani
 Johnny Pemberton as Bo Derek Thompson
 Jon Barinholtz as Marcus White
 Linda Porter as Myrtle Vartanian
 Josh Lawson as Tate Staskiewicz
 Kelly Stables as Kelly Watson
 Kelly Schumann as Justine Sikowitz
 Kerri Kenney-Silver as Jerusha Sturgis
 Irene White as Carol
 Amir M. Korangy as Sayid
 Jennifer Irwin as Laurie Neustadt

Episodes

Production

Casting
It was announced on September 10, 2018 that former The Middle star Eden Sher had been cast in a guest role as a potential new Cloud 9 employee named Penny, whom Ben Feldman's character Jonah and Colton Dunn’s character Garrett hire during the seasonal months.

Reception
The fourth season received critical acclaim with critics saying “Superstore remains a furtively fearless riot in its comedic approach to heavy and issues of the time” with a score of 100% on Rotten Tomatoes.

Ratings

References

External links
 
 
 

Superstore (TV series)
2018 American television seasons
2019 American television seasons